Gregorio Colonia (born May 9, 1963) is a retired flyweight weightlifter from the Philippines who competed at the 1988 Summer Olympics. After retiring from competitions he worked as a weightlifting coach. His trainees include his nephew Nestor Colonia.

References

1963 births
Living people
Filipino male weightlifters
Olympic weightlifters of the Philippines
Weightlifters at the 1988 Summer Olympics
20th-century Filipino people